The Enright Ridge Urban Eco-village, Inc. (ERUEV) is a registered 501(c)(3) organization located in the East Price Hill neighborhood of Cincinnati, Ohio.

About 
ERUEV was founded in 2004 by 19 residents who came together to establish "a community for people who are working to live more sustainably and with more awareness of the earth, whether it's planting gardens, rehabbing houses, or hosting community dinners.

References

Organizations based in Cincinnati